Norwegian Young Conservatives (Norwegian: Unge Høyres Landsforbund, UHL, normally referred to as Unge Høyre) is the Norwegian youth party of the Conservative Party. Its ideology is liberal conservatism. 
 
The party has 3,078 members as of 2022.

Leaders

Logos

External links 

Youth wings of political parties in Norway